The Rotterdam Convention (formally, the Rotterdam Convention on the Prior Informed Consent Procedure for Certain Hazardous Chemicals and Pesticides in International Trade) is a multilateral treaty to promote shared responsibilities in relation to importation of hazardous chemicals. The convention promotes open exchange of information and calls on exporters of hazardous chemicals to use proper labeling, include directions on safe handling, and inform purchasers of any known restrictions or bans. Signatory nations can decide whether to allow or ban the importation of chemicals listed in the treaty, and exporting countries are obliged to make sure that producers within their jurisdiction comply.

In 2012, the Secretariats of the Basel and Stockholm conventions, as well as the UNEP-part of the Rotterdam Convention Secretariat, merged to a single Secretariat with a matrix structure serving the three conventions. The three conventions now hold back to back Conferences of the Parties as part of their joint synergies decisions.

The ninth meeting of the Rotterdam Conference was held from 29 April to 10 May 2019 in Geneva, Switzerland.

Substances covered under the Convention
2,4,5-T and its salts and esters
Alachlor
Aldicarb
Aldrin
Asbestos – Actinolite, Anthophyllite, Amosite, Crocidolite, and Tremolite only
Benomyl (certain formulations)
Binapacryl
Captafol
Carbofuran (certain formulations)
Chlordane
Chlordimeform
Chlorobenzilate
DDT
Dieldrin
Dinitro-ortho-cresol (DNOC) and its salts
Dinoseb and its salts and esters
1,2-dibromoethane (EDB)
Endosulfan
Ethylene dichloride
Ethylene oxide
Fluoroacetamide
Hexachlorocyclohexane (mixed isomers)
Heptachlor
Hexachlorobenzene
Lindane
Mercury compounds including inorganic and organometallic mercury compounds
Methamidophos (certain formulations)
Methyl parathion (certain formulations)
Monocrotophos
Parathion
Pentachlorophenol and its salts and esters
Phosphamidon (certain formulations)
Polybrominated biphenyls (PBB)
Polychlorinated biphenyls (PCB)
Polychlorinated terphenyls (PCT)
Tetraethyl lead
Tetramethyl lead
Thiram (certain formulations)
Toxaphene
Tributyltin compounds
Tris (2,3-dibromopropyl) phosphate (TRIS)

Substances proposed for addition to the Convention

The Chemical Review Committee of the Rotterdam Convention decided to recommend to the seventh Conference of the parties meeting in 2015 that it consider the listing of the following chemicals in Annex III to the convention:
 Chrysotile asbestos (discussion deferred from the previous meeting of the Conference of the Parties).
 Fenthion (ultra low volume (ULV) formulations at or above 640 g active ingredient/L)
 Liquid formulations (emulsifiable concentrate and soluble concentrate) containing paraquat dichloride at or above 276 g/L, corresponding to paraquat ion at or above 200 g/L
 Trichlorfon

State parties

As of October 2018, the convention has 161 parties, which includes 158 UN member states, the Cook Islands, the State of Palestine, and the European Union. Non-member states include the United States.

Discussion about chrysotile asbestos

At the 2011 meeting of the Rotterdam Convention in Geneva, the Canadian delegation surprised many with a refusal to allow the addition of chrysotile asbestos fibers to the Rotterdam Convention.  Hearings are scheduled in the EU in the near future to evaluate the position of Canada and decide on the possibility of a punitive course of action.

In continuing its objection, Canada is the only G8 country objecting to the listing. Kyrgyzstan, Kazakhstan and Ukraine also objected. Vietnam had also raised an objection, but missed a follow-up meeting on the issue. In taking its position, the Canadian Government contrasted with India, which withdrew its long-standing objection to the addition of chrysotile to the list just prior to the 2011 conference. (India later reversed this position in 2013.) 
 
Numerous non-governmental organizations have publicly expressed criticism of Canada's decision to block this addition.

In September 2012, Canadian Industry minister Christian Paradis announced the Canadian government would no longer oppose inclusion of chrysotile in the convention.

Eight of the largest chrysotile producing and exporting countries opposed such a move at the Rotterdam Conference of Parties in 2015: Russia, Kazakhstan, India, Kyrgyzstan, Pakistan, Cuba, and Zimbabwe.

See also
 Basel Convention
 Stockholm Convention
 Safe Planet

References

External links
 Official site of The Rotterdam Convention
 Text of theConvention
 Ratifications 
 The Rotterdam Convention Prior Informed Consent Procedure

Chemical safety
Treaties concluded in 1998
Treaties entered into force in 2004
United Nations treaties
Treaties of Afghanistan
Treaties of Albania
Treaties of Antigua and Barbuda
Treaties of Argentina
Treaties of Armenia
Treaties of Australia
Treaties of Austria
Treaties of Bahrain
Treaties of Belgium
Treaties of Belize
Treaties of Benin
Treaties of Bolivia
Treaties of Bosnia and Herzegovina
Treaties of Botswana
Treaties of Brazil
Treaties of Bulgaria
Treaties of Burkina Faso
Treaties of Burundi
Treaties of Cambodia
Treaties of Cameroon
Treaties of Canada
Treaties of Cape Verde
Treaties of Chad
Treaties of Chile
Treaties of the People's Republic of China
Treaties of Colombia
Treaties of the Republic of the Congo
Treaties of the Cook Islands
Treaties of Costa Rica
Treaties of Ivory Coast
Treaties of Croatia
Treaties of Cuba
Treaties of Cyprus
Treaties of the Czech Republic
Treaties of North Korea
Treaties of the Democratic Republic of the Congo
Treaties of Denmark
Treaties of Djibouti
Treaties of Dominica
Treaties of the Dominican Republic
Treaties of Ecuador
Treaties of El Salvador
Treaties of Equatorial Guinea
Treaties of Eritrea
Treaties of Estonia
Treaties of Ethiopia
Treaties entered into by the European Union
Treaties of Finland
Treaties of France
Treaties of Gabon
Treaties of the Gambia
Treaties of Georgia (country)
Treaties of Germany
Treaties of Ghana
Treaties of Greece
Treaties of Guatemala
Treaties of Guinea
Treaties of Guinea-Bissau
Treaties of Guyana
Treaties of Honduras
Treaties of Hungary
Treaties of India
Treaties of Indonesia
Treaties of Iran
Treaties of Iraq
Treaties of Ireland
Treaties of the Islamic State of Afghanistan
Treaties of Israel
Treaties of Italy
Treaties of Jamaica
Treaties of Japan
Treaties of Jordan
Treaties of Kazakhstan
Treaties of Kenya
Treaties of Kuwait
Treaties of Kyrgyzstan
Treaties of Laos
Treaties of Latvia
Treaties of Lebanon
Treaties of Lesotho
Treaties of Liberia
Treaties of the Libyan Arab Jamahiriya
Treaties of Liechtenstein
Treaties of Lithuania
Treaties of Luxembourg
Treaties of Madagascar
Treaties of Malawi
Treaties of Malaysia
Treaties of the Maldives
Treaties of Mali
Treaties of Malta
Treaties of the Marshall Islands
Treaties of Mauritania
Treaties of Mauritius
Treaties of Mexico
Treaties of Mongolia
Treaties of Montenegro
Treaties of Morocco
Treaties of Mozambique
Treaties of Namibia
Treaties of Nepal
Treaties of the Netherlands
Treaties of New Zealand
Treaties of Nicaragua
Treaties of Niger
Treaties of Nigeria
Treaties of Norway
Treaties of Oman
Treaties of Pakistan
Treaties of Panama
Treaties of Paraguay
Treaties of Peru
Treaties of the Philippines
Treaties of Poland
Treaties of Portugal
Treaties of Qatar
Treaties of South Korea
Treaties of Moldova
Treaties of Romania
Treaties of Russia
Treaties of Rwanda
Treaties of Samoa
Treaties of São Tomé and Príncipe
Treaties of Saudi Arabia
Treaties of Senegal
Treaties of Serbia
Treaties of Sierra Leone
Treaties of Singapore
Treaties of Slovakia
Treaties of Slovenia
Treaties of the Transitional Federal Government of Somalia
Treaties of South Africa
Treaties of Spain
Treaties of Sri Lanka
Treaties of Saint Kitts and Nevis
Treaties of Saint Vincent and the Grenadines
Treaties of the State of Palestine
Treaties of the Republic of the Sudan (1985–2011)
Treaties of Suriname
Treaties of Eswatini
Treaties of Sweden
Treaties of Switzerland
Treaties of Syria
Treaties of Thailand
Treaties of North Macedonia
Treaties of Togo
Treaties of Tonga
Treaties of Trinidad and Tobago
Treaties of Tunisia
Treaties of Turkey
Treaties of Uganda
Treaties of Ukraine
Treaties of the United Arab Emirates
Treaties of the United Kingdom
Treaties of Tanzania
Treaties of Uruguay
Treaties of Vanuatu
Treaties of Venezuela
Treaties of Vietnam
Treaties of Yemen
Treaties of Zambia
Treaties of Zimbabwe
1998 in the Netherlands
Treaties extended to Hong Kong
Treaties extended to Macau
Chemistry-related lists